Norma Marsh (born 13 January 1936) is an Australian retired tennis player. At the Australian Championships, she reached the semifinals in 1958 (doubles) and the quarterfinals in 1962 and 1971 (singles). She was ranked No. 9 in Australia in 1962.

In 1959 she won the singles title at the Dutch Open Championships.

References

External links
 
 

Australian female tennis players
1936 births
Living people
Place of birth missing (living people)